Jayanta Das is an actor and director, acting in Raamdhenu (2011).

Filmography 

 Raamdhenu
 KHEL:The Game
 Adomya
 Aai Kot Nai (Maa)
 Jonaki Mon
 Moina Sorai Moina Maat
 Kadambari
 Mon
 Kanyadaan
 Nayak
 Bhumiputra
 Jun Jwole Kopalot
 Bukur Majot Jole

Television 
• Bharaghar

References 

Indian male actors
Indian directors
1969 births
Living people